Rastriya Janamukti Partry (translation: National People's Liberation Party) is a political party in Nepal. The party was founded on 6 May 1990 as Nepal Rastriya Janamukti Morcha. After unification with Rastriya Jana Party on 20 January 1992, the unified party adopted the name, Rastriya Janamukti Party.

History

Foundation (1990-1992) 
The Nepal Rastriya Janamukti Morcha Party was founded in Kathmandu on 6 May 1990. The party contested the 1991 general elections with a man as their electoral symbol. The party merged with Rastriya Jana Party on 20 January 1992 and renamed itself, Rastriya Janamukti Party also adopting a house as its electoral symbol.

First General Convention (1996-1999) 
The party's first General Convention was held in Kathmandu from 10 June to 12 June 1996. The general convention elected Malbar Singh Thapa as the party's first president and Gore Bahadur Khapangi as the party's first general secretary.

In the 1999 parliamentary election, the Rastriya Janamukti Party fielded 130 candidates and got 92,567 votes but none of their candidates were elected. During the party's second General Convention in Butwal, Malbar Singh Thapa and Gore Bahadur Khapangi were reelected to their posts.

Constituent Assembly (2006-2015) 
The party held its third General Convention in Lalitpur from 3 March to 5 March 2006. Malbar Singh Thapa was reelected as the party's president and Bayan Singh Rai was elected as the general secretary. The party contested the 2008 Constituent Assembly election and won 2 seats through proportional representation.

The party then held its fourth General Convention in Kawasoti and Malbar Singh Thapa was reelected party president and Keshav Suryavanshi was elected general secretary. In the 2013 Constituent Assembly election, the party again won 2 seats through proportional representation.

The two members in the Constituent Assembly, Shiva Lal Thapa and Sima Kumari BK, quit the party on 2 March 2015 and announced the formation of Rastriya Janamukti Party (Loktantrik).

Federal Nepal (2016-present) 
In the party's fifth General Convention in Lalitpur, Khadga Prasad Palungwa was elected president and Keshav Suryavanshi was elected general secretary. The party contested the 2017 local elections and won 20 seats in local governments. The party also contested the 2017 legislative and provincial elections but did not win any seats.

Electoral performance

Nepalese legislative elections

Sister organizations
The sister organizations of the Party are called Jana Sangathan (People's Organization). According to the RJP central office, the following are the current sister organizations:

 Janamukti Youth Federation
 Rastriya Mahila Morcha
 Rastriya Dalit Morcha
 Rastriya Purva Sainik Sangathan
 Nepal Aadibasi Mahasangh
 Nepal Bidhyarthi Morcha
 Rastriya Muslim Parisad
 Bahujatiya Sanskritik Morcha
 Rastriya Bhumihin-Sukumbasi Adhikar Manch
 Rastriya Tharu Manch Nepal 
 Khas arya Rastriya Manch Nepal 
In addition, teachers, intellectuals, athletes, transport entrepreneurs, and communication/media-related organizations are parties which are closely aligned with Janamukti Thought.

Leadership

List of presidents (1992–present)

List of general secretaries (1992–present)

References

Socialist parties in Nepal
Political parties established in 1990